The Newcastle School of Theology for Ministry was established in 2006 to provide theological education for the training and formation of lay leaders, deacons and priests in the Anglican Diocese of Newcastle. It ceased operation in 2014.

The Bishop’s Certificate and Bishop’s Diploma programmes commence with a learning weekend at the start of each year and participants can complete their studies over twelve months or at a slower pace over three years. In each case participants will be resourced through three learning weekends and thirty six sessions of guided study which are completed at home.

Many members of the Diocese of Newcastle have found that the broad and reflective style of the programmes has enabled them to take a further step on their journey of faith and in their commitment to ministry within the life of the Church.

The Newcastle School of Theology for Ministry is a wholly owned ministry of the Diocese of Newcastle. It has been established to resource and stimulate the members of our congregations. The Bishop’s Certificate and Diploma in Theology for Ministry have been developed by the Diocese for the Diocese.

The School's founding director was David John Battrick BSG.

References

External links
Newcastle School of Theology for Ministry

Anglican seminaries and theological colleges
Seminaries and theological colleges in New South Wales